Kawlin (ကောလင်းမြို့) is a town in the Sagaing Division in Myanmar. Since December 2018 it has been the administration headquarters for Kawlin District as well as Kawlin Township. As of 2019, the town had a population of 25,254, up from 21,431 in 2014.

History
Under the Burmese monarchy governors of Kawlin were by royal appointment. The site of the old town where they ruled is about a mile west of Kawlin, and is reduced to a village.  The new town of Kawlin was formed by consolidating the former villages of Taungin (တောင်အင်း) and Northin (မြောက်အင်းခေါ်).

See also
Sagaing Region

References

Township capitals of Myanmar
Populated places in Sagaing Region